Nikolai Nikolayevich Rybnikov (December 13, 1930 – October 22, 1990) was a Soviet and Russian film actor. People's Artist of the RSFSR (1981).

Biography

Early life and education
Nikolai Nikolayevich Rybnikov was born on 13 December 1930 in Borisoglebsk, Voronezh Oblast. His father Nikolai Nikolayevich, was a factory fitter and his mother, Klavdiya Aleksandrovna, a housewife. He also had a brother, Vyacheslav.

With the beginning of the Great Patriotic War, Rybnikov the elder went to the front, and the mother took her sons and moved to Stalingrad to her sister, believing that it would be safe there. But from the front they received news of the death of his father. Soon after receiving the tragic news, Klavdiya Aleksandrovna also died.

Nikolai Rybnikov grew up in Stalingrad and graduated from the local railway school. Afterwards, he studied at the Stalingrad Medical Institute for two years, but dropped out since he decided that the profession was not for him.

In 1948, Nikolai went to Moscow to study as an actor and entered VGIK (Sergei Gerasimov's and Tamara Makarova's course), he graduated in 1953. He was an actor of the auxiliary staff of the Stalingrad Drama Theater.

Since 1953, the actor was employed at the National Film Actors' Theatre.

Career

His film debut was as Drozdov in The Team from Our Street (1953). The picture went almost unnoticed, however next year the directors Aleksander Alov and Vladimir Naumov cast him in the film Anxious Youth. Rybnikov's work as laconic Kotka Grigorenko was positively noted by the critics.

His next role was of rural mechanic Fedor in Mikhail Schweitzer's film Other People's Relatives.

Fame came to the actor after the film Spring on Zarechnaya Street (1956), directed by Felix Mironer and Marlen Khutsiev. Next year he acted in another successful film, The Height directed by Aleksandr Zarkhi.

In 1958, Nikolai Rybnikov starred in the picture by Eldar Ryazanov, The Girl Without an Address, and although the public took the film well (it took second place at the box office), it received weak critical reviews. Nevertheless, in 1961 the actor agreed to appear in a comedy again, when director Yuri Chulyukin invited him to the main role of the lumberjack Ilya Kovrigin in the film The Girls. This picture had a huge audience success.

Nikolai Rybnikov became a favorite of audiences in the late 1950s and early 1960s, performing romantic characters of cheerful young men, with integrity and purity revealed through sharp and dramatic relationships with others.

In the following years, Rybnikov acted a lot in film, including in He Submits to the Sky, War and Peace, where he played the role of Vasily Denisov, Liberation, The Hockey Players. The picture The Seventh Heaven (1972) was a great success, in it Nikolai Rybnikov starred with his wife, Alla Larionova.

In the late 1970s and 1980s, the actor was invited to appear less often and only in episodic roles. The most vivid role of Rybnikov of this period is pensioner-squabbler Kondraty Petrovich in the film Marry a Captain (1985), for which he received the Soviet Screen Award in 1986 in the category of best actor in an episode role.

Nikolay Rybnikov died on the morning of 22 October 1990 in his Moscow apartment from a heart attack, a month and a half before his sixtieth birthday. He was buried at the Troyekurovskoye Cemetery.

Personal life 
His wife was actress Alla Larionova (1931—2000). He first met her as a student in VGIK. They raised two daughters — Alyona from Larionova's previous relationship with Ivan Pereverzev, and their biological child Arina.

Selected filmography

1954: Mysterious Discovery as Sailor
1954: The Team from our Street as Drozdov
1954: Substitute Player as Petrov
1955: Anxious Youth as Kotka Grigorenko 
1956: Other People's Relatives as Fyodor Gavrilovich Soloveikov
1956: Spring on Zarechnaya Street as Sasha Savchenko
1957: The Height as Nikolai Pasechnik
1958: The Girl Without an Address as Pasha Gusarov
1960: Normandie-Niémen as Captain Tarasenko
1962: The Girls as Ilya Kovrigin
1963: He Handles the Sky as Alexey Kolchin, test pilot
1965: The Hockey Players as Vasily Lashkov
1966: War and Peace I: Andrei Bolkonsky as Denisov
1966: War and Peace II: Natasha Rostova as Denisov
1966: Uncle's Dream as Pavel Alexandrovich Mozglyakov
1967: War and Peace III: The Year 1812 as Denisov
1967: War and Peace IV: Pierre Bezukhov as Denisov
1968: Wake Up Mukhin as Benkendorf / Titus Valerius / Inquisitor
1969: Kierunek Berlin as Polyak
1969: Old Friend as Anokhin
1970: Liberation I: The Fire Bulge as Major-General Panov
1970: Liberation II: Breakthrough as Major-General Panov
1971: Liberation III: Direction of the Main Blow as Major-General Panov
1972: The Circle as Viktor Vasiltsev
1972: Marble House as Mamochko
1974: Because I Love as Roman Ignatyevich Belyy
1975: Ivanov's Family as Ivan Ivanovich Ivanov
1976: Fun for Oldies as Nepeivoda, accordionist
1977: A Second Attempt of Victor Krokhin as Fyodor Ivanovich
1977: I Have an Idea! as Prince Potyomkin
1981: Bless You, Dear as Nikolai Yerofeyev
1985: Marry a Captain as Kondraty Petrovich
1987: Night Crew as Nikitin
1989: Private Detective, or Operation Cooperation as MP candidate
1990: Get Thee Out as Innkeeper Nikifor
1991: Izydi! as Nikifor (final film role)

Awards
 Honored Artist of the RSFSR (1964)
People's Artist of the RSFSR (1981)
 Soviet Screen Award (1986) — best actor in an episode role

References

External links 
 
 Чтобы люди помнили

1930 births
1990 deaths
20th-century Russian male actors
People from Borisoglebsk
Gerasimov Institute of Cinematography alumni
Honored Artists of the RSFSR
People's Artists of the RSFSR
Russian male film actors
Soviet male film actors
Burials in Troyekurovskoye Cemetery